The Delimara peninsula (Maltese: Dellimara) is a peninsula located on the southeastern tip of the island of Malta's South Eastern Region, forming half of Marsaxlokk's coast on Marsaxlokk Bay. It is mostly known as the location of the primary power station in Malta, the Delimara power station. The peninsula is also known for its two tourist-oriented bays: St Peter's Pool and Kalanka Bay. A lighthouse, a British fort and the remains of a Hospitaller battery can also be found on the peninsula.

See also 
 Delimara Tower
 Fort Delimara
 Delimara Lighthouse
 Delimara Power Station
Energy in Malta
 Delimara Transmitter

References 

Peninsulas of Malta
Marsaxlokk